Khosrow Mahalleh (also Romanized as Khosrow Maḩalleh; also known as Mollā Aḩmad) is a village in Lavandevil Rural District, Lavandevil District, Astara County, Gilan Province, Iran. At the 2006 census, its population was 547, in 129 families.

Language 
Linguistic composition of the village.

References 

Populated places in Astara County

Azerbaijani settlements in Gilan Province

Talysh settlements in Gilan Province